Amata rendalli is a moth of the family Erebidae. It was described by William Lucas Distant in 1897. It is found in South Africa.

References

 

Endemic moths of South Africa
rendalli
Moths described in 1897
Moths of Africa